Craig O'Neil Grant (December 18, 1968 – March 24, 2021), also known as Craig muMs Grant and muMs the Schemer, was an American poet and actor best known for his role as Arnold "Poet" Jackson on the HBO series Oz.

Life and career
Grant was born in New York City and raised in the Bronx. His father, Samuel, was a locksmith and carpenter at Montefiore Hospital, and his mother, Theresa (née Maxwell), was a teacher. He attended Mount St. Michael Academy High School, Bronx, New York. He
first gained widespread attention as a poet and performer when he was featured in the documentary SlamNation, which followed him and the other poets of 1996 Nuyorican Poetry Slam Team (Saul Williams, Beau Sia and Jessica Care Moore) as they competed at the 1996 National Poetry Slam.

Grant took the name "muMs" when he was 20 and performing in a rap group. Due to retaining traces of a childhood lisp, a friend suggested he call himself “Mumbles”, which Grant shortened to "muMs", as an acronym for "manipulator under Manipulation shhhhhhh!"

In Words in Your Face: A Guided Tour Through Twenty Years of the New York City Poetry Slam, author Cristin O'Keefe Aptowicz wrote of Grant's time in slam poetry, noting his writing "was street poetry at its purest. Thoughtful, precise but not without humor, his work spoke honestly about the life he and his friends and family lived and the city that he loved."

muMs performed his poetry on seasons 2, 3 and 4 of HBO's Def Poetry Jam, and was a member of New York City's LAByrinth Theater Company. In October 2007, muMs played a role in A View from 151st Street, a play about people trying to reconstruct their lives after gunfire.

In September 2014, muMs wrote and performed "A Sucker Emcee", hip-hop and slam poetry, based on his personal recollections.

In February 2015, muMs' play, titled "Paradox of the Urban Cliché", about a young couple living in Harlem, was performed at the Wild Project as part of the Poetic Theater Productions's Poetic License festival.

In February 2015, muMs played a role in "The Insurgents", a play about rage among the free, brave, and disenfranchised, produced by LAByrinth Theater Company.

Grant guest-starred in the 2016 Netflix series Luke Cage as Reggie "Squabbles", and was featured as a recurring character, Ricardo, on three episodes of Louis C.K.'s web series Horace and Pete. He appeared in two films by Steven Soderbergh, and had supporting roles in films including Bringing Out the Dead, Bamboozled, Birdman, and Good Time.

Death
Grant died in Wilmington, North Carolina on March 24, 2021, aged 52. His manager, Sekka Scher, said the cause was complications of diabetes.

Filmography

Film

Television

Video games

References

External links

1968 births
2021 deaths
20th-century African-American people
21st-century African-American writers
21st-century American poets
Place of death missing
Male actors from New York City
African-American male actors
African-American poets
Slam poets
Writers from New York City
American male film actors
American male television actors
American male video game actors
American male voice actors